C More Juniori (formerly Subtv Juniori, Sub Juniori, MTV3 Juniori and MTV Juniori) is a Finnish television channel targeting children owned and operated by MTV Oy. The channel is part of the C More channels package and broadcasts programs and movies aimed at children. The channel's transmission time is from morning until 8 p.m. C More Junior is shown on digital terrestrial, cable, broadband TV and satellite networks. The channel is hosted by Pekka Laukkarinen, Mikko Laine, Laura Haikala, Ella Tarvonen and Isa Hänninen.

Presenters 
The channel was long hosted by Kana, Janesta (also known as Tea Hiilloste) and Pekka Laukkarinen, who are familiar from Jane. At the end of 2010, Kana left Junior. At the beginning of 2011, three new presenters started on the canal farm: Aurora Belegu, Mikko Laine and Laura Haikala. Grandma, played by Miitta Sorvali, has also been seen on the channel. From the beginning of 2013, Tea Hiilloste focused on making children's music and left MTV3 Junior's placement. In her place, a new presenter started on the channel: Ella Tarvonen.

Programming
 Bob the Builder
 Batman: The Animated Series
 The Dibidogs
 Code Lyoko
 Back at the Barnyard
 The Penguins of Madagascar
 Chuggington
 The Jungle Bunch
 Dinosaur King
 Duck Dodgers
 Angry Birds Toons
 Once Upon a Time... Space
 Pororo the Little Penguin
 Leonardo
 Oggy and the Cockroaches
 The New Adventures of Lucky Luke
 Pokémon
 Noddy In Toyland
 Once Upon a Time... Planet Earth
 The Busy World of Richard Scarry
 X-Men: Evolution
 Droopy, Master Detective
 The Amazing World of Gumball
 The Daltons
 Teenage Mutant Ninja Turtles
 SpongeBob SquarePants
 T.O.T.S. (Tiny Ones Transport Service)
 The Adventures of Paddington Bear
 Munamies
 Fireman Sam
 Trulli Tales
 Teletubbies
 The Wonderful Adventures of Nils
 Tuomas Veturi
 Repe Sorsa
 Dogtanian and the Three Muskehounds
 Louie
 Maya the Honey Bee
 Littlest Pet Shop
 iCarly
 Super 4
 Transformers: Animated
 Dora the Explorer
 Bruno and the Banana Bunch
 Mimmikoto
 Postman Pat (Season 1-5)
 Sandmännchen

External links
C More Juniori official website

References

Television channels and stations established in 2006
Television channels in Finland
Bonnier Group